Wiedenfeld or Weidenfeld may refer to:

 Boris Wiedenfeld, a jazz pianist and producer who has worked with Matthias Lupri
 Hugo von Wiedenfeld, an Austrian Jewish architect; see Türkischer Tempel

See also
 
 Weidenfeld (disambiguation)

German-language surnames
Jewish surnames